This is a list of countries with Burger King franchises. Burger King (BK) itself began as a franchise of its progenitor company, Insta-Burger King. It grew in the United States using a combination of corporate locations and franchising, before divesting itself of its corporate holdings in 2013. It began its international expansion in 1969 with a location in Canada, followed by Australia in 1971, and Europe in 1975. Latin America and South America became part of its market later in that decade, Asia followed in the 1980s, and Northern Africa and the Middle East followed shortly thereafter. Sub-Saharan Africa and the former nations of the Iron Curtain came much later, beginning in the late 1990s and continuing into the 2010s.

As of 2014, Burger King operates in almost every country in the Western Hemisphere, and most of Europe and East Asia. It has embarked on a plan to base a good portion of its future growth in the BRIC Nations of Brazil, Russia, India, and China, with plans to open more than 3000 locations in three of those four countries. Burger King also has a longstanding presence at U.S. Army and U.S. Air Force installations worldwide, dating back to the 1980s under a contract with Army and Air Force Exchange Service. Today, while other chains such as Taco Bell, Popeyes, and Subway have a presence on military bases, virtually every major Army and Air Force installation hosts a BK restaurant.

History 

Burger King was first founded in Jacksonville, Florida In 1953 as Insta-Burger King. Shortly after the acquisition of the chain by Pillsbury in 1969, Burger King opened its first Canadian restaurant in Windsor, Ontario, in 1969. Other international locations followed soon after: Oceania in 1971 with its Australian franchise Hungry Jack's, and Europe in 1975 with a restaurant in Madrid, Spain. Beginning in 1982, BK and its franchisees began operating stores in several East Asian countries, including Japan, Taiwan, Singapore and South Korea. Due to high competition, all of the Japanese locations were closed in 2001; however, BK reentered the Japanese market in June 2007. BK's Central and South American operations began in Mexico in the late 1970s, and by the early 1980s it was operating locations in Caracas, Venezuela, Santiago, Chile and Buenos Aires, Argentina.

While Burger King lags behind McDonald's in international locations by over 12,000 stores, by 2008 it had managed to become the largest chain in several countries, including Mexico and Spain.

The company divides its international operations into three segments: The Middle East, Europe and Africa division (EMEA), Asia-Pacific (APAC) and Latin America and the Caribbean (LAC). In each of these regions, Burger King has established several subsidiaries to develop strategic partnerships and alliances to expand into new territories. In its EMEA group, Burger King's Switzerland-based subsidiary Burger King Europe GmbH is responsible for the licensing and development of BK franchises in those regions. In the APAC region, the Singapore-based BK AsiaPac, Pte. Ltd. business unit handles franchising for East Asia, the Asian subcontinent and all Oceanic territories. The LAC region includes Mexico, Central and South America and the Caribbean Islands.

Africa 

During 2012, the African market saw a new agreement with Grand Parade Investments of South Africa to enter then Africa's largest economy, with restaurants opening in 2013. The company began its move into Sub-Saharan Africa in May 2013 when Burger King opened its first outlets in South Africa. The company sold franchise rights to local gaming and slots machine operator Grand Parade Investments Ltd. The South African operation sold over double its initial forecasts in its opening weeks with sales of $474,838 at just one of its outlets in Cape Town in its first seven weeks.  In a deal with local petrochemical company Sasol, outlets were opened at filling stations across the country starting in 2014. In April 2014 it was announced that due to high demand, the number of new outlets being opened in 2014 would be increased from 12 to 14 across the country. As of December 2015 there are 51 Burger King restaurants in South Africa. 10 restaurants are set to open in Mauritius by 2021.

Asia 

The first Burger King in Asia opened in Granville Road, Hong Kong on 7 August 1979, as the 2500th Burger King globally. In 1982, franchisees opened stores in several East Asian countries, including Japan, Taiwan, Singapore and South Korea. Due to high competition, it withdrew from the Japanese market in 2001. However, Burger King reentered the Japanese market by opening the first outlet in Shinjuku, Tokyo in November 2006.

It also reentered the Hong Kong market in December 2007. This time its Hong Kong operation is wholly owned by North Asia Strategic, who obtained the exclusive right to operate from BK AsiaPac Pte Limited. The first outlet was opened on 29 December 2007 in the Sun Arcade, Canton Road, Tsim Sha Tsui, Kowloon. As of 2008, 15 stores were in operation, including five in Hong Kong Island (Central, Wanchai, Causeway Bay and Fortress Hill), five in Kowloon (Tsim Sha Tsui, Hung Hom, Mongkok, Wong Tai Sin and Tsz Wan Shan) and five in the New Territories. However, due to fierce competition, legal problems, and rising rents, the number of stores was reduced to two in late 2015.

2012 saw a major international expansion initiative. The primary thrust was aimed at the BRIC nations, with several new master franchise agreements in those countries that will eventually create upwards of 2500 new stores by 2020. One of these deals also creates the single largest international franchise agreement in the company history, a deal to open over 1000 stores in China with a new "super"-franchise headed by the Kurdoglu family of Turkey. An updated agreement with its Russian franchisee will see a major expansion into Siberia. This move puts Burger King in a superior position to its chief rival McDonald's, as it currently doesn't operate any locations east of the Ural Mountains.

Europe

Burger King began its expansion in Europe in 1975 with its first location in Madrid, Spain. The first German branch of Burger King was opened in 1976 at the Kurfürstendamm in West Berlin. In 1990 was opened the first branch at the former East Germany, in Dresden.

In December 2012, BK returned to the French market, based on an agreement with multinational operator Autogrill, a move that has met with some excitement in the country. In July 1997, it was announced the chain would be leaving the country, closing its 22 franchised and 17 corporate locations, after a poorly executed entry into the market that left it unable to compete against McDonald's and local chain Quick. The partnership with Autogrill is a move to consolidate BK's presence in travel plazas along major highways in France, Italy, Poland and other European nations.

In November 2013, Groupe Bertrand, who owns several restaurant franchises, acquired the BK master franchise Autogrill, becoming one of their franchisees. In September 2015, Groupe Bertrand announced being in talks with Quick's owner, investment fund Qualium, to take over all the franchise and convert all Quick restaurants in France into BKs.

In December 2013, BK returned to Finland, after three decades of absence. The first restaurant, located on Mannerheimintie in central Helsinki, instantly proved so popular that on every day since its opening, people queued in front of the restaurant to get in, sometimes for over half an hour. The only exception so far has been Christmas time, when the restaurant was closed. According to Mikko Molberg, the leader of the Finnish Burger King franchise, the restaurant has attracted over 2000 customers on every single day, which has surprised the restaurant employees and the franchise owners. The long queues have been extensively covered and ridiculed in social media, comparing them to people queuing in front of a McDonald's restaurant in Moscow in the early 1990s, and contrasting them with the nearly nonexistent queues at the BK restaurants in Stockholm.

In 2018, BK expanded into Azerbaijan, Greece and Kosovo, as well as re-entering the Slovakian market after nearly 7 years of absence. In June 2019, BK opened its doors in Albania after 7 months of hype in the QTU Shopping Mall.

In 2020, the first 3 BK restaurants opened in Estonia. This was the period of the COVID-19 pandemic so the outlets had to be opened via Tallink by the popular videoconferencing software program Zoom. In December 2020, BK restaurants were opened in Latvia and Lithuania.

North America 

North America is the company's home territory and home to its first non-American stores; it opened its first international restaurant in Windsor, Ontario, Canada in 1969.

Since its purchase in 2011, Burger King has seen a 14% sales increase in its Latin American and Caribbean operations. The continued expansion in these market could provide a significant portions of Burger King's growth during the decade of the 2010s. In the Mexican market, Burger King sold 97 corporate-owned locations to its largest franchisee in that country. The deal means multi-chain operator Alsea S.A.B. de C.V will eventually operate approximately half of Mexico's 400+ Burger King locations while receiving exclusive expansion rights in Mexico for a twenty-year period.

Elsewhere in Central America, Burger King entered in a deal with another of its franchises, the Beboca Group of Panama, to create a new corporate entity to handle expansion and logistics in the LAC region, which until this time had no centralized operations group. The deal follows a unification of the company's web presence in Latin America and the Caribbean, as well as aligning all of its various web initiatives including mobile services, Facebook presence and guest relation tools. The Latin American moves are part of a corporate plan to take advantage of the growing middle class in these regions.

Burger King's growth into the Caribbean began in 1963 when the company opened its first location in Puerto Rico. These locations were the first restaurants the company opened outside the continental United States.

Oceania 

When Burger King moved to expand its operations into Australia, it found that its business name was already trademarked by a takeaway food shop in Adelaide. The Canadian-Australian franchisee, Jack Cowin, selected the "Hungry Jack" brand name, one of then Burger King's owner Pillsbury's U.S. pancake mixture products, and slightly changed the name to a possessive form by adding an apostrophe and "s" to form the new name "Hungry Jack's". In 1996, shortly after the Australian trademark on the Burger King name lapsed, Burger King began to open its own Australian stores in 1997. As a result of Burger King's actions, Hungry Jack's owner Jack Cowin and his company Competitive Foods Australia, began legal proceedings in 2001 against the Burger King Corporation. Hungry Jack's won the case, and Burger King eventually left the country. Hungry Jack's took ownership of the former Burger King locations and subsequently renamed the remaining Burger King locations as Hungry Jack's. As of June 2019, Burger King had 83 stores operating in New Zealand. Due to the COVID-19 pandemic, Burger King went into receivership in April 2020.

South America

Former markets

International subsidiaries 
Burger King has approximately 20 foreign subsidiaries to oversee operations in the markets it does business in.

Notes

References 

Burger King
Burger King
Burger King